The state anthem of the Republic of Bashkortostan is the regional anthem of the Russian federal subject of Bashkortostan, adopted on 12 October 1993 and officially on 18 September 2008. It is annexed to the article 112 Constitution of the Republic of Bashkortostan as one of the national symbols of Bashkortostan.

The anthem has official lyrics in two of the republic's official languages: Bashkir and Russian. The Bashkir lyrics were written by authors Ravil Bikbayev and Rashit Shakurov, and the Russian lyrics by Farit Idrisov and Svetlana Churayeva. The melody was composed by Farit Idrisov.

History
The anthem was first approved by the Law of the Republic of Bashkortostan "On the State Anthem of the Republic of Bashkortostan" on 12 October 1993. The music "Republic" was originally composed by Farit Idrisov on 11 October 1990 and was later used for the anthem. The music is also used for the Bashkir folk song "Ural"

On 6 July 1999, the Law "On State Symbols of the Republic of Bashkortostan" was approved, along with the order of execution and use of the national anthem.

The anthem is performed during opening and closing ceremonies and in meetings dedicated to state holidays. It is performed while taking the oath upon taking office as Head of Bashkortostan, during the opening and closing meetings of the State Assembly — Qurultay of the Republic of Bashkortostan, during the official lifting ceremony of the national flag, and during visits to the republic by foreign heads of state.

Lyrics
There are both separate Bashkir and Russian vocal renditions. It is played in orchestral choir renditions, videotapes, television, and radio broadcasts. An unofficial singable English verse translation, which is not a literal translation of the original Bashkir and Russian versions, is also included.

Bashkir version

Russian version

Unofficial English version

Notes

References

External links
Bashkir version
Russian version
A page with Bashkortostan's National Symbols (archive link)

Bashkortostan
Regional songs
Music of Bashkortostan
National anthem compositions in E major